The Golden Twenties ( also known as the Happy Twenties, was a five-year time period within the decade of the 1920s in Germany. The era began in 1924 after the end of the hyperinflation following on World War I and ended with the Wall Street Crash of 1929.

The German term is often applied to the country's experience of healthy economic growth, expansion of liberal values in society and spurt in experimental and creative efforts in the field of art. Before this period, the Weimar Republic had experienced record-breaking levels of inflation of one trillion percent between January 1919 and November 1923. The inflation was so severe that printed currency was often used as domestic fuel, and everyday requirements such as food, soap and electricity cost a wheelbarrow full of banknotes. It was only after radical economic reform measures initiated by the Weimar Republic, such as introduction of a new currency, the Rentenmark, tighter fiscal control and a reduction in bureaucratic hurdles led to an environment of economic stability and prosperity in Germany.

In the United States, the corresponding period was called the Roaring Twenties; in France, it was known as Les Années folles.

The Golden Twenties in Germany

The Golden Twenties in Germany is often referred to as a borrowed time, meaning that this time of exploring the arts, humanities, freedom, and financial stability was atypical and would soon end. The United States was the only country to come out of World War I without debt or reparations to pay. Germany owed a huge sum and had to take a loan from the US just to survive. No one had any hint that there would be a stock market crash with worldwide repercussions and that this crash would ruin Germany and set the stage for Hitler to come into power. Thus, the expression of a "borrowed time" came to being. It was the calm before the storm.

Germany shared many similar social trends with France and America at this time, such as the famous women's haircut called "the Bob" or "Bob cut", exploring clothing fashions, cabaret dancers, and performances, and dancing "the Charleston".

The art movement known as New Objectivity originated in Germany during this time.

Cabaret
Cabaret dancing was the first form of "strip tease". Customers often sat at a table in a night club or pub and waited to be entertained by the performances of nearly naked girls. These were much like the productions of the Moulin Rouge in Paris, France, during this time.

Anita Berber was a famous, even infamous, cabaret dancer during this time. She was known to have danced naked on top of her customers' tables, often while urinating on them and the table and/or hitting them with champagne bottles.

Prominent figures
 Marlene Dietrich was a German-American actress and singer.
 Thomas Mann (6 June 1875 – 12 August 1955) was a German novelist, short story writer, social critic, philanthropist, essayist, and the 1929 Nobel Prize in Literature laureate. He became famous during this time for writing the novel The Magic Mountain (Der Zauberberg).
 Fritz Lang was the director of Metropolis, a 1927 German expressionist epic science-fiction drama film. This famous film is iconic for its advanced special effects and depiction of technological and scientific themes.
 Anita Berber (10 June 1899 – 10 November 1928) was a German dancer, actress, and writer who was the subject of an Otto Dix painting. She lived during the Weimar period.
 Otto Dix (2 December 1891 – 25 July 1969) was a German painter and printmaker noted for his harshly realistic depictions of Weimar society and the brutality of war. Along with George Grosz, he is widely considered one of the most important artists of the New Objectivity (Neue Sachlichkeit) trend.

See also

1920s Berlin
Weimar culture
Roaring Twenties, the equivalent in North America
European interwar economy

References

External links
Fashion of the Golden Twenties (1920–1923) 
http://www.cabaret-berlin.com/?p=264'
https://www.wsj.com/articles/SB10001424052970203471004577141353667947254
https://courses.cit.cornell.edu/his452/Alcohol/germancabaret.html#an4
https://web.archive.org/web/20161021094808/http://www.planet-schule.de/wissenspool/20er-jahre/inhalt/hintergrund.html

1920s in Europe
Late modern Europe
Roaring Twenties